Kamarudin bin Meranun is a Malaysian businessman who is currently the Chairman of AirAsia and CEO of the Tune Group.

Early life
Kamarudin was born in Malaysia, 1960. He is a Minangkabau descent from Gugukrendah, Agam, West Sumatera. He received a Diploma in Actuarial Science from Universiti Teknologi MARA and received the Life Insurance Institute of Malaysia Best Actuarial Student award in 1983.

Business career
From 1988 to 1993, Kamarudin worked for the Arab-Malaysian Merchant Bank as a Portfolio Manager. He then moved in 1994 to Innosabah Executive Management as executive director. He was appointed Director of AirAsia in 2001, then as Executive director in 2004, then as Deputy CEO in 2005. He took on the role of Treasurer on top of that in 2012. Later that year, he moved into the role of Director, then moved to the role of Chairman of AirAsia in 2013, a role which he still holds as of 2016. He was appointed CEO of AirAsia X in 2015. He is also a board member of the Queens Park Rangers Football Club.

Honours
  :
  Commander of the Order of Meritorious Service (PJN) - Datuk (2013)

  :
  Knight Companion of the Order of Sultan Ahmad Shah of Pahang (DSAP) - Dato' (2008)
  :
  Officer of the Order of the Defender of State (DSPN) - Datuk (2006)

References

1960s births
Living people
Malaysian businesspeople
Queens Park Rangers F.C. directors and chairmen
Malaysian people of Minangkabau descent
Commanders of the Order of Meritorious Service